Roi Et Club Football is a Thai professional football club based in Roi Et Province in north-eastern Thailand. They are currently members of the Thailand Amateur League North Eastern Region and play at the Pankkee Arena.

History
The club was established in 2008 and joined Regional League Division 2 North Eastern Region. They finished bottom of the division in 2009, but were champions of the division two seasons later, advancing to the promotion play-offs, in which they finished fourth in a six-club group. They won their division again in 2012, but again only finished fourth in the promotion play-off group stage. After winning their regional division for a third successive season in 2013, the club won their group in the promotion play-offs, before going on to win the knock-out stages, defeating Chiangmai 2–0 on aggregate over two legs and earning promotion to Division One.

Roi Et's first season in Division One saw them finish fourth-from bottom, two points from safety, resulting in relegation straight back to Division Two. Following league reorganisation in 2017, the division was renamed League 4. The club were excluded from the league the following year after failing to obtain a licence from the Thai FA. However, they were subsequently rebranded as Roi Et CF and allowed to enter the North Eastern Region of the Thailand Amateur League for the 2018 season.

Stadium and locations

Season-by-season record

Honours
Regional League Division 2 
Play-off champions: 2013
North Eastern Region champions: 2011, 2012, 2013

References

External links
Official website

Association football clubs established in 2008
Football clubs in Thailand
Sport in Roi Et province
2008 establishments in Thailand